Igor Vovkovinskiy (September 18, 1982 – August 20, 2021), also known as Igor Ladan, was a Ukrainian-American law student, actor and tallest living person in the United States, at , briefly taking the record from George Bell. 

Originally from Ukraine, Vovkovinskiy moved to Rochester, Minnesota in 1989 to be treated at the Mayo Clinic. At that time, he was already at least six feet tall.

Vovkovinskiy acted in commercials and films, including the 2011 comedy Hall Pass, and became better known for wearing a T-shirt that read "World's Biggest Obama Supporter" to a Barack Obama rally. He was the first official tallest living person from two countries. He joined singer Zlata Ognevich in representing Ukraine in the Eurovision Song Contest 2013.

Vovkovinskiy's height was attributed to a tumor pressing on his pituitary gland, causing it to release an excessive amount of growth hormone. In 2019, he said on his YouTube channel that he was undergoing treatment for a heart condition.

Vovkovinskiy was hospitalized for heart disease and died on August 20, 2021, at the age of 38.

See also
 List of tallest people (men)

References

External links
 
 60 minutes Australia 2012
 IgorTheUkrainian His YouTube channel

1982 births
2021 deaths
People with gigantism
People from Bar, Ukraine
Ukrainian emigrants to the United States